John Cecil Dauth,  (born 9 April 1947) is an Australian public servant and diplomat. He was the Australian High Commissioner to the United Kingdom from 2008 to 2013.

Career
Dauth was born in Brisbane, Queensland. Graduating from the University of Sydney with a Bachelor of Arts degree, he joined the Australian Public Service in the Department of External Affairs in 1969, and was seconded to Buckingham Palace between 1977 and 1980, serving in the Press Office of the Royal Household as Assistant Press Secretary to Queen Elizabeth II and Press Secretary to the Prince of Wales.

Dauth has served in a number of positions overseas including: Nigeria (Second Secretary, 1970–1972); Tutor in Residence at Burgmann College, Australian National University (1974–1975); Iran (Chargé d'affaires, 1983–1985); and New Caledonia (Consul-General, 1986–1987). He later served as High Commissioner to New Zealand (2006–2008). Prior to this he was Permanent Representative to the United Nations (2001–2006) and High Commissioner to Malaysia (1993–1996). He was the Consul-General in New Caledonia from 1986 to 1987 before being declared persona non-grata by the French government after Paris complained that he was too close to the Kanak pro-independence movement. In 2008, the then Prime Minister of Australia, Kevin Rudd, appointed Dauth as Australian High Commissioner to the United Kingdom, succeeding Richard Alston. Mike Rann succeeded Dauth on 1 February 2013.

Personal life
Dauth is in a same-sex relationship with his partner, Richard Glynn.

Honours
Dauth was appointed Lieutenant of the Royal Victorian Order (LVO) in 1980 for service as Australian Press Secretary to the Queen during the 1980 Royal Visit to Australia, Officer of the Order of Australia (AO) in 2011 for distinguished service to international relations through the advancement of Australia's diplomatic, trade and cultural relationships, particularly with the United Kingdom and New Zealand, and through contributions to the United Nations, and Officer of the Order of the British Empire (OBE) in the 2022 Birthday Honours for voluntary service to the British Red Cross.

References

1947 births
Consuls-General of Australia in Noumea
Officers of the Order of Australia
Australian Lieutenants of the Royal Victorian Order
Living people
Australian LGBT people
Permanent Representatives of Australia to the United Nations
High Commissioners of Australia to New Zealand
High Commissioners of Australia to the United Kingdom
Permanent Representatives of Australia to the International Maritime Organization
University of Sydney alumni
People from Brisbane
Australian Officers of the Order of the British Empire
High Commissioners of Australia to the Cook Islands